Fred Scoulding (26 August 1887 – 25 August 1928) was an English cricketer. He played for Essex between 1912 and 1920.

References

External links

1887 births
1928 deaths
English cricketers
Essex cricketers
People from Bow, London
Cricketers from Greater London
Monmouthshire cricketers